Xi Arietis, Latinized from ξ Arietis, is the Bayer designation for a binary star system in the northern constellation of Aries. It has an apparent visual magnitude of 5.46, and so is dimly visible to the naked eye. At that distance, the visual magnitude of the star is diminished by an extinction factor of 0.24 due to interstellar dust.

This is a double-lined spectroscopic binary. The spectrum matches a stellar classification of B7 IV, which would indicate a subgiant star that has exhausted the supply of hydrogen at its core and is in the process of evolving into a giant star. Xi Arietis was once a designation for Psi Ceti (ψ Cet, ψ Ceti).

References

External links
Aladin previewer
Aladin sky atlas
 HR 702

B-type subgiants
Spectroscopic binaries
Arietis, Xi
Aries (constellation)
BD+09 0316
Arietis, 24
014951
011249
0702